Castellazzo Bormida (Ël Castlass in Piedmontese, and Castlass an Burmia or Castlas an Burmia locally) is a comune (municipality) in the Province of Alessandria in the Italian region Piedmont, located about  southeast of Turin and about  southwest of Alessandria.  

Castellazzo Bormida borders the following municipalities: Alessandria, Borgoratto Alessandrino, Casal Cermelli, Castelspina, Frascaro, Frugarolo, Gamalero, Oviglio, and Predosa.

References

External links
 Official website